Coligny is a commune in the Ain department in eastern France.

Geography
The commune lies near Bourg-en-Bresse; the Solnan forms its southwestern border.

Celtic background
Coligny is famed for its Celtic lunisolar calendar, the "Coligny calendar". The calendar, which dates from the turn of the 1st century, has been key in the understanding of the knowledge of astronomy among the Gauls, and also supplied interesting information about their language (e.g., their names for months and the words for "lucky" and "unlucky"). It was an engraved bronze tablet originally discovered as fragments in 1897. It is written in the Latin alphabet and it represents a five-year cycle composed of three years having twelve lunar months and two years (the first and third) having thirteen lunar months.

At the end of the 19th century a bronze statue was discovered in the town and has been christened the Dieu de Coligny (God of Coligny).

Population

Personalities
Coligny was the birthplace of Joseph Darnand (1897–1945), a French pro-Nazi traitor and leader of the Vichy French Milice.

Lexicographer and poet Marie-Marguerite Brun (1713–1794) was born in Coligny.

See also
Communes of the Ain department

References

External links

Official site
The almanac of Coligny

Communes of Ain
Ain communes articles needing translation from French Wikipedia